Placenta accreta occurs when all or part of the placenta attaches abnormally to the myometrium (the muscular layer of the uterine wall). Three grades of abnormal placental attachment are defined according to the depth of attachment and invasion into the muscular layers of the uterus:
 Accreta – chorionic villi attached to the myometrium, rather than being restricted within the decidua basalis.
 Increta – chorionic villi invaded into the myometrium.
 Percreta – chorionic villi invaded through the perimetrium (uterine serosa).

Because of abnormal attachment to the myometrium, placenta accreta is associated with an increased risk of heavy bleeding at the time of attempted vaginal delivery. The need for transfusion of blood products is frequent, and surgical removal of the uterus (hysterectomy) is sometimes required to control life-threatening bleeding.

Rates of placenta accreta are increasing. As of 2016, placenta accreta affects an estimated 1 in 272 pregnancies.

Risk factors
An important risk factor for placenta accreta is placenta previa in the presence of a uterine scar. Placenta previa is an independent risk factor for placenta accreta. Additional reported risk factors for placenta accreta include maternal age and multiparity, other prior uterine surgery, prior uterine curettage, uterine irradiation, endometrial ablation, Asherman syndrome, uterine leiomyomata, uterine anomalies, and smoking.

The condition is increased in incidence by the presence of scar tissue i.e. Asherman's syndrome usually from past uterine surgery, especially from a past dilation and curettage, (which is used for many indications including miscarriage, termination, and postpartum hemorrhage), myomectomy, or caesarean section. A thin decidua can also be a contributing factor to such trophoblastic invasion. Some studies suggest that the rate of incidence is higher when the fetus is female. Other risk factors include low-lying placenta, anterior placenta, congenital or acquired uterine defects (such as uterine septa), leiomyoma, ectopic implantation of placenta (including cornual pregnancy).

Pregnant women above 35 years of age who have had a caesarian section and now have a placenta previa overlying the uterine scar have a 40% chance of placenta accreta.

Pathogenesis
The placenta forms an abnormally firm and deep attachment to the uterine wall. There is absence of the decidua basalis and incomplete development of the Nitabuch's layer. There are three forms of placenta accreta, distinguishable by the depth of penetration.

Diagnosis
When the antepartum diagnosis of placenta accreta is made, it is usually based on ultrasound findings in the second or third trimester. Sonographic findings that may be suggestive of placenta accreta include:
 Loss of normal hypoechoic retroplacental zone
 Multiple vascular lacunae (irregular vascular spaces) within placenta, giving "Swiss cheese" appearance
 Blood vessels or placental tissue bridging uterine-placental margin, myometrial-bladder interface, or crossing the uterine serosa
 Retroplacental myometrial thickness of <1 mm
 Numerous coherent vessels visualized with 3-dimensional power Doppler in basal view

Unfortunately, the diagnosis is not easy and is affected by a significant interobserver variability. In doubtful cases it is possible to perform a nuclear magnetic resonance (MRI) of the pelvis, which has a very good sensitivity and specificity for this disorder.  MRI findings associated with placenta accreta include dark T2 bands, bulging of the uterus, and loss of the dark T2 interface.

Although there are isolated case reports of placenta accreta being diagnosed in the first trimester or at the time of abortion <20 weeks' gestational age, the predictive value of first-trimester ultrasound for this diagnosis remains unknown. Women with a placenta previa or "low-lying placenta" overlying a uterine scar early in pregnancy should undergo follow-up imaging in the third trimester with attention to the potential presence of placenta accreta.

Complications
 Damage to local organs (e.g., bowel, bladder, uterus and neurovascular structures in the retroperitoneum and lateral pelvic sidewalls from placental implantation and its removal;
 Postoperative bleeding requiring repeated surgery;
 Amniotic fluid embolism;
 Complications (such as dilutional coagulopathy, consumptive coagulopathy, acute transfusion reactions, transfusion-associated lung injury, acute respiratory distress syndrome, and electrolyte abnormalities) caused by transfusion of large volumes of blood products, crystalloids, and other volume expanders;
 Postoperative thromboembolism, infection, multisystem organ failure, and maternal death.

The exact incidence of maternal mortality related to placenta accreta and its complications is unknown, but it is significant, especially if the urinary bladder is involved

Treatment
Treatment may be delivery by caesarean section and abdominal hysterectomy if placenta accreta is diagnosed before birth. Oxytocin and antibiotics are used for post-surgical management. When there is partially separated placenta with focal accreta, best option is removal of placenta. If it is important to save the woman's uterus (for future pregnancies) then resection around the placenta may be successful. Conservative treatment can also be uterus sparing but may not be as successful and has a higher risk of complications.  
Techniques include:
 Leaving the placenta in the uterus and curettage of uterus. Methotrexate has been used in this case. 
 Intrauterine balloon catheterisation to compress blood vessels
 Embolisation of pelvic vessels
 Internal iliac artery ligation
 Bilateral uterine artery ligation

In cases where there is invasion of placental tissue and blood vessels into the bladder, it is treated in similar manner to abdominal pregnancy and manual placental removal is avoided. However, this may eventually need hysterectomy and/or partial cystectomy.

If the patient decides to proceed with a vaginal delivery, blood products for transfusion and an anesthesiologist are kept ready at delivery.

Epidemiology 
The reported incidence of placenta accreta has increased from approximately 0.8 per 1000 deliveries in the 1980s to 3 per 1000 deliveries in the past decade.

Incidence has been increasing with increased rates of caesarean deliveries, with rates of 1 in 4,027 pregnancies in the 1970s, 1 in 2,510 in the 1980s, and 1 in 533 for 1982–2002. In 2002, ACOG estimated that incidence has increased 10-fold over the past 50 years. The risk of placenta accreta in future deliveries after caesarian section is 0.4-0.8%. For patients with placenta previa, risk increases with number of previous caesarean sections, with rates of 3%, 11%, 40%, 61%, and 67% for the first, second, third, fourth, and fifth or greater number of caesarean sections.

References

External links 
 National Accreta Foundation

Complications of labour and delivery
Human pregnancy
Medical emergencies